Harpendyreus marlieri is a butterfly in the family Lycaenidae. It is found in the Democratic Republic of the Congo.

References

Butterflies described in 1961
Harpendyreus
Endemic fauna of the Democratic Republic of the Congo